Khvosh Yeylaq (also Romanized as Khvosh Yeylāq, Khosh Yeylāq, Khowsh-e Yeylāq, and Khowsh Yeylāq; also known as Khāsh Āylān) is a village in Cheshmeh Saran Rural District, Cheshmeh Saran District, Azadshahr County, Golestan Province, Iran. At the 2006 census, its population was 362, in 92 families.

References 

Populated places in Azadshahr County